Saorlaith (older spelling Saorfhlaith) (aka Sáerlaith) is an Irish female given name. Alternative spellings are 'Searlaith', 'Searla', 'Saorfhlaith' or 'Saorla'.

Pronunciation- 'Seh'rla'.  The spelling Serlah is the best way to get the correct pronunciation from English speakers.

The name translates as 'Noble Princess', or 'free-born woman'.  Saorlaith was the mother of an Ulster king and was reputed to be of great beauty and wisdom.

The name has seen some increased popularity in Ireland with the renewed popularity of Irish names in recent years.

Bearers of the name

 Saerlaith inion Elcomach, Irish centenarian, died 969.

See also
List of Irish-language given names

External links
 http://www.medievalscotland.org/kmo/AnnalsIndex/Feminine/Saerlaith.shtml

Irish-language feminine given names